Cuthbert Aikman Simpson was an Anglican priest and academic. From 1954 to 1959, he was Regius Professor of Hebrew at the University of Oxford. From 1959 to 1969, he was Dean of Christ Church, Oxford.

Born in Charlottetown, Prince Edward Island, Canada, on 24 May 1892, educated at the University of King's College in Nova Scotia and ordained in 1921, his first post was a curacy at  St Alban's Woodside, Nova Scotia. He was a Fellow and Tutor at the  General Theological Seminary in New York City. In 1954 he became a Canon of Christ Church, Oxford, and Regius Professor of Hebrew in the University of Oxford. Five years later he became Dean of Christ Church, a post he held until 1969. In 1960 Simpson served as president to the Society for Old Testament Study. An eminent author, he died on 30 June 1969.

External links
Bibliographic directory from Project Canterbury
The Manner of Saying Low Mass

References

 
 
 

1892 births
1969 deaths
University of King's College alumni
Fellows of Christ Church, Oxford
Regius Professors of Hebrew (University of Oxford)
20th-century English Anglican priests
20th-century English theologians
Deans of Christ Church, Oxford
Presidents of the Society for Old Testament Study